Edgar Phillips (28 July 1891 – 13 August 1956) was a New Zealand cricketer. He played in eight first-class matches for Wellington from 1911 to 1921.

See also
 List of Wellington representative cricketers

References

External links
 

1891 births
1956 deaths
New Zealand cricketers
Wellington cricketers
Cricketers from Wellington City